This is a partial list of notable faculty and alumni of Vassar College.

Notable alumni

Academics
 Laura Sumner, class of 1942 – numismatist
 Jane Kelley Adams, class of 1875 — educator
 Heloise Hersey, class of 1876 – professor of literature
 Emily Jordan Folger, class of 1879 – co-founder of the Folger Shakespeare Library
 Anita Florence Hemmings, class of 1897 – Vassar College's first African-American graduate
 Scottie Fitzgerald, class of 1942 – writer and journalist, only daughter of novelist F. Scott Fitzgerald
 Ida Hill, class of 1901 – archaeologist, classical scholar and historian
 Belle Turnbull, class of 1904 – award-winning poet 
 Marion Coats Graves, class of 1907 - philosophy, first president of Sarah Lawrence College
 Edith Clarke, class of 1908 – America's first female professor of electrical engineering
Ruth Wendell Washburn, class of 1913 – educational psychologist
Chen Hengzhe, class of 1919 – China's first female professor and a pioneer of vernacular literature
 Mildred H. McAfee, class of 1920 – president of Wellesley College and first director of WAVES (Women Accepted for Volunteer Emergency Service)
 Caroline F. Ware, class of 1920 – professor of history at American University and a New Deal activist
 Jean Schneider, class of 1921 – Pulitzer Prize for History winner; research associate of Leonard D. White
 Mary Bunting, class of 1931 – microbiologist and president of Radcliffe College
Millie Almy, class of 1936 – American psychologist and "Grandame" of early childhood education.
 Susan Casteras, class of 1971 – professor of art history at the University of Washington
 Winifred Asprey, class of 1938 – pioneering mathematician and computer scientist
 Nancy Nichols Barker, class of 1946 – professor of history at the University of Texas at Austin
 Jean Briggs, class of 1951 – anthropologist and expert on Inuit languages
 Barbara W. Newell, class of 1951 – first female chancellor of the State University System of Florida, president of Wellesley College
 Eleanor M. Fox, class of 1956 - Walter J. Derenberg Professor of Trade Regulation in the New York University School of Law
 Margaret Dauler Wilson, class of 1960 – professor of philosophy at Princeton University
 Marcia P. Sward, class of 1961 – executive director of the Mathematical Association of America
 Ellen Rosand, class of 1961 –  musicologist, historian, and opera critic
 Sau Lan Wu, class of 1963 – particle physicist and the Enrico Fermi Distinguished Professor of Physics at the University of Wisconsin–Madison
 Sandra Lach Arlinghaus, class of 1964 - mathematical geographer. Adjunct Professor, University of Michigan (Ann Arbor); Founder and Director Institute of Mathematical Geography. 
 Susan W. Coates, MA 1968 – psychologist, Columbia University
 M. R. C. Greenwood, class of 1968 – health scientist, president of the University of Hawaii
 Nancy Dye, class of 1969 – president of Oberlin College
 Jo Ann Gora, class of 1969 – president of Ball State University
 Vera Schwarz, class of 1969 – Freeman Professor of East Asian Studies at Wesleyan University
 Eugenia Del Pino, class of 1969 –  developmental biologist; first Ecuadorian citizen to be elected to the United States National Academy of Sciences (2006)
 Erica Funkhouser, class of 1971 – poet, professor at MIT
 Christopher W. Morris, class of 1971 – professor and chair of philosophy at the University of Maryland
 Gloria Cordes Larson, class of 1972 – politician and president of Bentley University
 Judith Malafronte, class of 1972 – mezzo-soprano on the faculty at Yale University, winner of the Grand Prize at the International Vocal Competition 's-Hertogenbosch
 Michael Kimmel, class of 1972 – sociologist; distinguished professor of sociology at the Stony Brook University; spokesperson of the National Organization for Men Against Sexism (NOMAS)
 Darra Goldstein, class of 1973 – founding editor of Gastronomica: The Journal of Food and Culture; professor at Williams College
 Molly Nesbit, class of 1974 – modern and contemporary art historian
 Anthony Apesos, class of 1975 – painter and professor of fine arts at the Art Institute of Boston at Lesley University
 Francisco Xavier Castellanos, class of 1975 – Director of Research at the NYU Child Study Center.
 Jane Margaret O'Brien, class of 1975 – professor of chemistry and president emerita of St. Mary's College of Maryland
 Richard L. Huganir, class of 1975 – professor and Director of the Solomon H. Snyder Department of Neuroscience; investigator with Howard Hughes Medical Institute
 Iris Mack, class of 1975 – writer, speaker, former MIT professor
 Jeffrey Schnapp, class of 1975 – former director of the Stanford Humanities Lab, faculty director at metaLAB (at) Harvard
 Rochelle Lieber, class of 1976 – professor of linguistics at the University of New Hampshire and co-editor in chief of the Language and Linguistics Compass
 Jyotsna Vaid, class of 1976 – professor of psychology at Texas A&M University
 Carole Maso, class of 1977 – novelist and essayist, professor of literary arts at Brown University
 Jamshed Bharucha, class of 1978 – former president of Cooper Union; cognitive neuroscientist
 Seamus Ross, class of 1979 – dean and professor at the iSchool at the University of Toronto; Founding Director of HATII
 John Carlstrom, class of 1981 – professor at the University of Chicago, MacArthur Award-winning astrophysicist
 Sarah Barringer Gordon, class of 1982 – Arlin M. Adams Professor of Constitutional Law and a professor of history at the University of Pennsylvania
 Heinz Insu Fenkl, class of 1982 – author, professor of English and Asian Studies at SUNY New Paltz
 Matthew Koss, class of 1983 – solid-state physicist and professor
 Mark Burstein, class of 1984 – executive vice president of Princeton University; president of Lawrence University
 Rebecca Reynolds, class of 1984 – poet, administrator and professor at Rutgers University
 Keith Scribner, class of 1984 – novelist, short-story writer, screenwriter, essayist and professor at Oregon State University
 Alison Boden, class of 1984 –  author, dean of religious life and the dean of the chapel at Princeton University.
 David B. Allison, class of 1985 – distinguished professor, Quetelet Endowed Professor of Public Health, UAB
 Andrea McCarren, class of 1985 – television journalist and educator, first teacher of broadcast journalism at Harvard University
 Tina Campt, class of 1986 – professor of women's studies at Barnard College
 Jennifer Summit, class of 1987 – professor of English, former chair of the Stanford University English Department
 Anne Brodsky, class of 1987 – professor in psychology and gender and women's studies at the University of Maryland, Baltimore County
 Seamus Carey, class of 1987 – president of Transylvania University
Michael Witmore, class of 1989 – Director of the Folger Shakespeare Library
 Steven A. Cook, class of 1990 – Hasib J. Saabbagh Senior Fellow for Middle Eastern Studies at the Council on Foreign Relations
 Greg Hrbek, class of 1990 – author and professor, Writer-in-Residence at Skidmore College
 Christina Maranci, class of 1990 – researcher, writer, translator, historian, and professor at Tufts University
 Maria Fadiman, class of 1991 – ethnobotanist and associate professor of geosciences at Florida Atlantic University
 Stacey M. Floyd-Thomas, class of 1991 –  associate professor of ethics and society at the Vanderbilt University Divinity School
 Daniel Alexander Jones, class of 1991 – award-winning performance artist and playwright; assistant professor of theatre at Fordham University
 Sarah Churchwell, class of 1991 – professor of American literature and public understanding of the humanities at the University of East Anglia
 Kate Moorehead, class of 1992 –  Episcopal priest and the tenth dean of St. John's Cathedral and the Diocese of Florida
 Matt Donovan, class of 1995 – poet, winner of a Whiting Award, chair of the creative writing department at Santa Fe University of Art and Design
 Erica Field, class of 1996 – economist, professor at Duke University, and winner of the Elaine Bennett Research Prize
 Emily Berquist, class of 1997 – assistant professor of history at California State University, Long Beach, writer, and historian
 Ross Benjamin, class of 2003 – translator of German literature
 John Figdor, class of 2006 – Humanist Chaplain at Stanford University
 Alice D. Snyder – class of 1909 (A.B.) and 1911 (A.M.), and Vassar College English professor from 1914 to 1943
 Helen L. Webster (1853-1928), philologist and educator, taught at Vassar College from 1889 to 1890 before leaving for Wellesley College

Activists and philanthropists
 Mary Louise Frost, class of 1866 – peace activist, editor
 Mary Boyce Temple, class of 1877 – preservationist and philanthropist
 Susie Forrest Swift, class of 1883 - editor, Salvation Army worker, Catholic nun
 Marion Cothren, class of 1900 – suffrage and peace activist, children's author
Emma Waldo Smith Marshall, class of 1900 – missionary in Burma, taught Greek at a Baptist seminary
 Gertrude Gogin, class of 1908 – YWCA national secretary for girls' programs, 1918-1927
 Eleanor Fitchen, class of 1934 – landmarks and environment in New York State
 Lucy Kennedy Miller, class of 1902 – prominent American suffragist
 Sylvia McLaughlin, class of 1939 – environmental pioneer
 Patsy Bullitt Collins, class of 1942 – prolific donor and philanthropist
 June Jackson Christmas, class of 1945 – founder of community psychiatric program Harlem Rehabilitation Center
 Anne Hendricks Bass, class of 1963 – philanthropist, art collector, documentary filmmaker
 Phyllis Lambert, class of 1947 – philanthropist and member of the Bronfman family
 Elizabeth Cushman Titus Putnam, class of 1955 – conservationist and winner of the Presidential Citizens Medal
 Barbara Coombs Lee, class of 1969 – activist and president of Compassion & Choices
 Jonathan Granoff, class of 1970 – president of the Global Security Institute
 Jessie Gruman, class of 1975 – author, founder and president of the Washington-based Center for Advancing Health
 Urvashi Vaid, class of 1979 – political activist
 Simon Greer, class of 1990 – president and CEO of Nathan Cummings Foundation, president and CEO of the Jewish Funds for Justice
 Ilyse Hogue, class of 1991 – former president of NARAL Pro-Choice America
 Ronit Avni, class of 2000 – award-winning filmmaker, founder and executive director of Just Vision
 Emily Kunstler, class of 2000 – activist and documentary filmmaker
 Alexandra Sicotte-Levesque, class of 2000 – founder of Journalists for Human Rights
 Eliza Kennedy Smith, class of 1912 – prominent American suffragist and government watchdog

Adventurers and athletes
 Alice Huyler Ramsey, class of 1907 – first woman to cross the continent driving a car
 Ethan Zohn, class of 1996 – Survivor: Africa winner and philanthropist

Artists and architects
 Patty Prather Thum, class year unknown (19th century) – painter and art critic
 Ruth Maxon Adams, class of 1904 – architect
 Margaret Burnham Geddes, class of 1929 – architect and urban planner
 Elizabeth Bauer Mock, class of 1932 – influential advocate for modern architecture in the United States
 Linda Nochlin, class of 1951 – pioneer in the field of feminist art theory
 Mira Lehr, class of 1956 – artist
 Nancy Graves, class of 1961 – first woman to solo at the Whitney Museum of American Art
 Margaret McCurry, class of 1964 – architect
 Michael Portnoy, class of 1993 –  multimedia artist, choreographer, musician, actor and curator
 Phyllis Lambert, class of 1947 – leading architect, creator of the Seagrams building in Manhattan, founder of the Canadian Centre for Architecture 
Mary Ping, class of 2000 – New York based fashion designer
 Clancy Philbrick, class of 2008 – contemporary artist
 Alexa Meade, class of 2009 – uses the human body as a canvas
 Ruth Inge Hardison – sculptor, artist, and photographer; studied music and creative writing
 Ruth Starr Rose – artist, lithographer, and serigrapher
 Elizabeth Coffin, class of 1870 – first person in the United States to receive their Master of Fine Arts
 Terry deRoy Gruber - Photographer and author
 Faith Holland, class of 2007

Business
 Mary F. Hoyt, class of 1880 – first woman to receive a position in the United States federal civil service
 Louise Seaman Bechtel, class of 1915 – head of the first children's book department in an American publishing house (Macmillan Co.)
 Martha Firestone Ford, class of 1946 – billionaire, chairman of majority owner of the Detroit Lions, boardmember Henry Ford Health System
 Martha Rivers Ingram, class of 1957 – chairman of Ingram Industries, multi-billionaire
 Nina Zagat, class of 1963 – co-founder of Zagat Survey
 Geraldine Laybourne, class of 1969 – creator of Nickelodeon and Nick at Nite; CEO of Oxygen Media
 Paula Madison, class of 1974 – former president of KNBC
 Ken Kaess, class of 1976 – former CEO of DDB Worldwide
 Robert Friedman, class of 1978 –  president of Classic Media, New Line TV, and AOL, Interactive Marketing & TV
 Scott Kauffman, class of 1978 – former CEO of MDC Partners
 Phil Griffin, class of 1979 – president of MSNBC
 Lurita Doan, class of 1979 – founder of New Technology Management, Inc.
 James B. Rosenwald III, class of 1980 – co-founder and managing partner of Dalton Investments LLC
 Pamela Mars Wright, class of 1982 – Trustee of Vassar College, heir to the Mars fortune
 Mitch Feierstein, class of 1983 – investor, banker and writer
 Yannis Vardinoyannis, class of 1984 – billionaire; founding member of the Greek Super League and president in 2007; executive vice chairman of the independent oil refinery Motor Oil Hellas
 Jeanne Greenberg-Rohatyn, class of 1989 – owner of Salon 94
 Ian Gerard, class of 1990 – co-founder and CEO of Gen Art
 Caterina Fake, class of 1991 – founder of Flickr
 Elisabeth Murdoch, class of 1992 – CEO of Shine Limited, daughter of Rupert Murdoch
 Jon Fisher, class of 1994 – entrepreneur
 Lee Zalben, class of 1995 – founder of Peanut Butter & Co.
 Elisa Strauss, class of 1998 – proprietor of Confetti Cakes, a top New York City-based bakery specializing in custom designed cakes
 Katia Beauchamp, class of 2005 – founder and Co-CEO of Birchbox
 Yu Liu (or Eric Liu), class of 2008 – founder of One Cloud Technologies, later acquired by Alibaba Group

Drama, film, and television
 Frances Sternhagen, class of 1951 – Tony Award-winning actress
 Zuzana Justman, class of 1954, documentary filmmaker and writer
 Toni Grant, class of 1964 – psychologist and radio host
 Rebecca Eaton, class of 1969 – Emmy Award-winning executive producer of Masterpiece on PBS; listed among Time magazine's "100 Most Influential People in the World" (2011)
 Margaret Lazarus, class of 1969 – Academy Award-winning documentary filmmaker
 Ann Northrop, class of 1970 –  journalist and activist; co-host of TV news program Gay USA
 Meryl Streep, class of 1971 – Academy Award-winning actress
 Mary Nissenson, class of 1974 – Peabody award-winning TV news reporter
 Eben Fiske Ostby, class of 1977 – animator, vice president of software at Pixar
 Chip Reid, class of 1977 – CBS Chief White House Correspondent
 Phil Griffin, class of 1979 – president of MSNBC
 Lloyd Braun, class of 1980 – media executive, president of ABC (2002–2004)
 Marion Lipschutz, class of 1980 –  film director and co-founder of Incite Pictures
 Hung Huang, class of 1984 – fashion figure, publisher; listed among Time magazine's "100 Most Influential People in the World" (2011)
 Jon Tenney, class of 1984 – actor
 Sakina Jaffrey, class of 1984 – actress
 Yvonne Welbon, class of 1984 – documentary filmmaker
 Andrew Zimmern, class of 1984 – chef and TV personality
 Lisa Kudrow, class of 1985 – Emmy Award-winning actress
 Jonathan Littman, class of 1985 – multiple Emmy Award-winning producer; president of Jerry Bruckheimer Television
 Hope Davis, class of 1986 – actress
 Dan Bucatinsky, class of 1987 – Emmy Award-winning actor, writer, and producer
 Paul Zehrer, class of 1987 – film and television director, writer, producer, and editor
 Saar Klein, class of 1989 – Academy Award-nominated film editor
 Tanya Wright, class of 1989 – actress
 Carlos Jacott, class of 1989 – actor and writer
 John Gatins, class of 1990 – Academy Award-nominated screenwriter, Real Steel and Flight
 Jonathan Karl, class of 1990 – ABC News Senior Political Correspondent, author
 Erika Amato, class of 1991 – singer, actress
 Noah Baumbach, class of 1991 – Academy Award-nominated writer, director
 Benjamin Busch, class of 1991 – actor, author, Lieutenant Colonel in the U.S. Marine Corps
 Stacy London, class of 1991 – television host, author, and magazine editor
 Jason Blum, class of 1991 – producer of films, including Get Out and Academy Award-winning Whiplash
 Eddie Schmidt, class of 1992 – Academy Award-nominated documentary filmmaker
 Catherine Kellner, class of 1992 – actress and producer
 Judd Ehrlich, class of 1993 – director and producer
 Monica Macer, class of 1993 – writer and producer
 Carrie Kei Heim, class of 1994 – child actress, now an attorney
 Erin Daniels, class of 1995 – actress
 Lecy Goranson, class of 1996 – actress
 Ethan Zohn, class of 1996 – Survivor: Africa winner and philanthropist
 Jessi Klein, class of 1997 – Emmy Award-winning writer and comedian
 Angela Goethals, class of 1999 – actress
 Marguerite Moreau, class of 1999 – actress
 Jonathan Togo, class of 1999 – actor
Matthew Newton, class of 1999 – actor
 Hannah Bos and Paul Thureen, class of 2000 – two-thirds of the devised theatre company The Debate Society and co-creators, writers, and producers of the HBO series Somebody Somewhere
 Justin Long, class of 2000 – actor, Apple Computer spokesperson
 Bradford Louryk, class of 2000 – Broadway artist and actor
 Penny Lane, class of 2001 – documentary director and producer, Our Nixon; assistant professor at Colgate University
 Shaka King, class of 2001-Academy Award-nominated film producer, screenwriter, and director of Judas and the Black Messiah
 Alexa Alemanni, class of 2002 – actress
 Adnan Malik, class of 2003 – Pakistani actor and filmmaker 
 Julia Weldon, class of 2005 – actress
 Jonás Cuarón, class of 2005 – co-writer of Gravity
 Grace Gummer, class of 2008 – actress
 Sasha Velour, class of 2009 – winner of RuPaul's Drag Race (season 9)
 Aviva Drescher, American television personality
Shaka King,  Academy Award-nominated film director, screenwriter, and film producer
 Jeff Davis – writer and creator of police procedural drama Criminal Minds and MTV's Teen Wolf
 Kerri Green – actress, director
 Lisa Lassek – film producer and editor
 Jay Severin – commentator and talk radio host
 Sandy Stern – film producer, known for his work on the films Pump Up the Volume, Being John Malkovich, and Saved!
 Lisa Zane – actress
 Thomas Dean Donnelly – screenwriter of films such as Sahara and an upcoming adaption of the Uncharted video games
 Tom Gorai – film producer
 Alysia Reiner – actress in Orange is the New Black
 Lester Lewis, television writer and television producer, The Larry Sanders Show
 Lilli Cooper, class of 2012 – Tony-nominated actress in Tootsieand SpongeBob SquarePants, The Broadway Musical
 Ethan Slater-Tony-nominated actor in SpongeBob SquarePants, The Broadway Musical
Malinda Kathleen Reese, YouTube personality, actress and singer
 Raphael Raph Korine, Big Brother UK Runner Up in 2017, also studied in Zurich and Paris

Espionage
 Elizabeth Bentley, class of 1930 – American spy for the Soviet Union

Fashion
 Louisa Gummer, class of 2013, model; daughter of Meryl Streep

Music
 Elizabeth Bristol Greenleaf, class of 1917 – collector of folk songs
 Jane O'Leary, class of 1968 – musician and composer
 Jamie Broumas, class of 1981 – jazz singer, vocal instructor and arts administrator
 Jonathan Elliott, class of 1984 – Classical composer
 Drew Zingg, class of 1981 – guitarist for Steely Dan
 Joseph Bertolozzi, class of 1981 – composer and musician with works ranging from full symphony orchestra to solo gongs
 Amy Powers, class of 1982 – Emmy-nominated lyricist, songwriter and producer
 Alan Licht, class of 1990 – guitarist, composer, writer and, journalist
 Erika Amato, class of 1991 – singer (Velvet Chain)
 Linda Lister, class of 1991 – soprano, soloist, professor at the University of Evansville
 Howard Fishman, class of 1992 – singer, guitarist, bandleader and composer
 Rachael Yamagata, class of 1996 – singer-songwriter
 Jamie Christopherson, class of 1997 – musician known for scoring movies and video games
 Amanda Forsythe, class of 1998 – award-winning soprano; particularly admired for her interpretations of baroque music and the works of Rossini
 Sam Endicott, class of 1999 – singer (The Bravery) and John Conway, class of 2000, keyboardist in The Bravery
 Brian Grosz, class of 1999 – alt-folk musician, member of Skabba the Hut
 Hayley Taylor, class of 1999 – singer-songwriter and actress whose songs have been featured on many popular television shows, including How I Met Your Mother, Royal Pains, and Pretty Little Liars
 The Hazzards – ukulele-based band, best known for their cult hit single "Gay Boyfriend"
 Victoria Legrand, class of 2003 – singer (Beach House)
 Genghis Tron, classes of 2005 and 2006 – band composed of Vassar graduates
 MS MR, class of 2010 – pop duo composed of Max Hershenow and Lizzy Plapinger

Politics and law
 Harriot Eaton Stanton Blatch, class of 1878 – suffragette and daughter of Elizabeth Cady Stanton
 Ōyama Sutematsu, class of 1882 – first Japanese woman to earn a college degree
 Crystal Eastman, class of 1903 – co-author of the Equal Rights Amendment
 Inez Milholland, class of 1909 – suffragist; known as the martyr of the women's suffrage movement
 Elinor Morgenthau, class of 1913 – Democratic party activist and spouse of Henry Morgenthau, Jr.
 Catherine Bauer Wurster, class of 1926 – urban housing reformer
 Katherine Elkus White, class of 1928 – Democratic Party politician and diplomat, who served as Mayor of Red Bank, New Jersey (1951–1956), chairwoman of the New Jersey Highway Authority (1955–1964), and United States Ambassador to Denmark (1964–1968)
 Lydia Stevens, class of 1939 – Connecticut House of Representatives (1988, 1990) as a Republican, president of the Greenwich Broadcasting Company
 Emily W. Sunstein, class of 1944 – campaigner, political activist and biographer
 Patricia M. Byrne, class of 1946 – U.S. Ambassador to Burma
 Frances Farenthold, class of 1946 – Texas State Legislator and human rights activist
 Julie Finley, United States ambassador
 Pauline Newman, class of 1947 – Circuit Judge, United States Court of Appeals for the Federal Circuit
 Anne Armstrong, class of 1949 – first female Counselor to the President; Ambassador to the United Kingdom (1976–1977); recipient of the Presidential Medal of Freedom
 Selwa Roosevelt, class of 1950 – Chief of Protocol of the United States for almost seven years (1982–1989)—longer than anyone has ever served in that position.
 Sylvia Bacon, class of 1952 – judge of the Superior Court of the District of Columbia; considered by both Richard Nixon and Ronald Reagan as a potential nominee to the Supreme Court of the United States, at a time when no women had yet been appointed to the Court
 Sarah Goddard Power, class of 1957 – Democratic Party activist and University of Michigan Regent
 Patricia Fleming, class of 1957 – first director of the White House Office of National AIDS Policy (ONAP)
 Pamela Ann Rymer, class of 1961 – Judge, United States Court of Appeals for the Ninth Circuit
 Julia Donovan Darlow, class of 1963 – attorney and member of the University of Michigan Board of Regents
 Diana Gribbon Motz, class of 1965 – Judge, U.S. Court of Appeals for the Fourth Circuit
 Margaret Milner Richardson, class of 1965 – IRS commissioner (1993–1997)
 Bobbie Kilberg, class of 1965 – Republican operative who has worked for Presidents Richard Nixon, Gerald Ford, George H.W. Bush, and George W. Bush, president and CEO of the Northern Virginia Technology Council.
 Susan Combs, class of 1966 – Texas Comptroller of Public Accounts
 Linda Fairstein, class of 1969 – prosecutor in the "Preppie Murder" trial of Robert Chambers and head of sex crimes unit in the Central Park jogger case; author
 Catherine Abate, class of 1969 – New York state senator, president and CEO of the Community Healthcare Network
 Margarita Penón Góngora, class of 1970 – First Lady of Costa Rica (1986–1990); advocate and promoter of the principal Gender Equality Law approved by Congress in 1989
 Betsy McCaughey, class of 1970 – 72nd Lieutenant Governor of New York (1995–1998), influential critic of Bill Clinton's healthcare proposal
 Linda R. Greenstein, class of 1971 – legislator and politician, New Jersey State Senate, 14th district
 Robert H. Edmunds, Jr. – Associate Justice of the North Carolina Supreme Court
 Vicki Miles-LaGrange, class of 1974 – first African-American female to become a United States Attorney
 Richard W. Roberts, class of 1974 – Judge, United States District Court for the District of Columbia
 Nancy Killefer, class of 1975 – government consultant
 Jeffrey Goldstein, class of 1977 – Under Secretary of the Treasury for Domestic Finance (2010–2011), managing director of the World Bank
 Alison Renee Lee, class of 1979 – South Carolina Circuit Judge in the Fifth Judicial Circuit and is a nominee for United States District Judge of the United States District Court for the District of South Carolina.
 Rick Lazio, class of 1980 – United States Representative
 Bala Garba Jahumpa, class of 1980 – Gambian politician and diplomat
 Lee A. Feinstein, class of 1981 – U.S. Ambassador to Poland (2009–2012).
 Benson Whitney, class of 1982 – U.S. Ambassador to Norway
 Cheryl Kagan, class of 1983 – Maryland House of Delegates from 1995 to 2003
 Sherrilyn Ifill, class of 1984 - President and Director-Counsel of NAACP Legal Defense Fund
 Marc Thiessen, class of 1989 – White House speechwriter (2004–2009)
 Cleon Edwards, class of 1990 - Deputy State Director, United States Senate, Office of Hillary Rodham Clinton
 Alfonso H. Lopez, class of 1992 – Virginia State Delegate
 Carrie Goldberg, class of 1999 – attorney who specializes in sexual privacy violations
 Deborah L. Wince-Smith – president of the Council on Competitiveness

Science and medicine
 Christine Ladd-Franklin, class of 1869 – psychologist
 Ellen Swallow Richards, class of 1870 – chemist
 Frances Fisher Wood, class of 1874 -  educator and scientist
 Ellen Churchill Semple, class of 1882 – geographer
 Alice G. Bryant, class of 1885 - otolaryngologist and inventor
 Antonia Maury, class of 1887 – astronomer
 Margaret Floy Washburn, class of 1891 – psychologist
 Millicent Todd Bingham, class of 1902 – geographer
 Ruth Benedict, class of 1909 – anthropologist
 Edith Banfield Jackson, class of 1916 – behavioral pediatrician
 Mary Calderone, class of 1925 – physician
 Harriet Guild, class of 1920 – physician
 Grace Hopper, class of 1928 – computer scientist
 Grace Lotowycz, class of 1938 - botanist; alpinist; Women Airforce Service Pilots
 Marian Koshland, class of 1942 – immunologist who discovered that the differences in amino acid composition of antibodies explains the efficiency and effectiveness with which they combat a huge range of foreign invaders
June Biedler, class of 1947  biomedical scientist
 Vera Rubin, class of 1948 – astronomer
 Beatrix Ann (McCleary) Hamburg, class of 1944 – first African American admitted to Vassar; psychiatrist, medical researcher
 Lois Haibt, class of 1955 – computer scientist
 Heather Lechtman, class of 1956 – materials scientist and archaeologist; Director of the Center for Materials Research in Archaeology and Ethnology (CMRAE) at the Massachusetts Institute of Technology; Macarthur Award winner
 Olga F. Linares, class of 1958 – anthropologist and senior researcher at STRI
 Patricia Goldman Rakic, class of 1959 – neuroscientist
 Bernadine P. Healy, class of 1965 – cardiologist; Director of the National Institutes of Health (NIH) (1991–1993), dean of Ohio State University Medical School; president of the American Red Cross (1999–2001)
 Valerie Rusch, class of 1971 –  thoracic surgeon, Miner Family Chair for Intrathoracic Cancers and Vice Chair for Clinical Research at Memorial Sloan Kettering Cancer Center
 Ellen Kovner Silbergeld, class of 1967 – engineer
 Alice F. Healy, class of 1968 – psychologist
 Claudia L. Thomas, class of 1971 – surgeon, helped form the Students' Afro-American Society (SAS) and pushed for the Black Studies program at Vassar
 Anne B. Young, class of 1969 – neuroscientist
 Jeffrey Brenner, class of 1990 – founder and executive director of Camden Coalition of Healthcare Providers; 2013 MacArthur Award ("Genius Grant") winner
 Maria Fadiman, class of 1991 – ethnobotanist

Writers
 Carol Brightman – author
 Patricia Buckley Bozell – author and publisher
 Marion Hamilton Carter - educator, journalist, author
 Elizabeth Williams Champney, class of 1869 – author of Three Vassar Girls series
 Dorothy Deming, nurse and author 
 Rebecca Odes - author and co-founder of Gurl.com
 Mary Harriott Norris, class of 1870 – author and dean of women
 Mary Parker Woodworth, class of 1870 – writer and speaker 
 Maria Brace Kimball, class of 1872 – educator, elocutionist, writer
 Eva March Tappan, class of 1875 – author
 Amy Wentworth Stone, class of 1898, – children's book author
 Jean Webster, class of 1901 – author of Daddy Long Legs
 Agnes de Lima, class of 1908 – author of  Our Enemy the Child
 Elizabeth Page, class of 1912 – author of The Tree of Liberty (1939)
 Edna St. Vincent Millay, class of 1917 – Pulitzer Prize–winning poet
 Nora Benjamin Kubie, class of 1920 – children's writer
 Lois Long, class of 1922 – writer for The New Yorker
 Angelica Gibbs, class of 1930 – short story writer for The New Yorker and novelist
 Marie Rodell, class of 1932 – literary agent and author who managed the publications of much of environmentalist Rachel Carson's writings, as well as the first book by Martin Luther King Jr.
 Mary McCarthy, class of 1933 – novelist, critic
 Elizabeth Bishop, class of 1934 – Pulitzer Prize-winning poet and Poet Laureate of the United States from 1949 to 1950
 Eleanor Ruggles (1916-2008) class of 1938, biographer
 Ruth Stiles Gannet, class of 1944 – author of the My Father's Dragon series
 Shana Alexander, class of 1945 – first woman staff writer and columnist for Life magazine
 Sue Kaufman, class of 1947 – author best known for the novel Diary of a Mad Housewife
 Charlotte Curtis, class of 1950 – New York Times editor
 Alexandra Ripley, class of 1955 – writer best known for Scarlett (1991), the sequel to Gone with the Wind
 Elaine Schwartz Hochman, class of 1956-  art historian
 Jane Kramer, class of 1959 – journalist for The New Yorker
 Mary Oliver, class of 1959 –  poet; won the National Book Award and the Pulitzer Prize
 Gloria Guardia, class of 1962 – novelist and critic
 Barbara McMartin, class of 1964 – mathematician who became an environmentalist and author of books on the Adirondack Mountains
 Penelope Casas, class of 1965 – food writer, cookbook author and expert on the cuisine of Spain
 Susan Gordon Lydon, class of 1965 – feminist writer known for "The Politics of Orgasm"
 Reggie Nadelson class of 1966 – mystery novelist and biographer
 Lucinda Franks, class of 1968& – Pulitzer Prize winner, writer for The New York Times and The New Yorker
 Sally Gibson, class of 1968 – author, archivist and heritage consultant
 Mindy Aloff, class of 1969 –  editor, journalist, essayist, and dance critic
 Jane Smiley, class of 1971 – Pulitzer Prize-winning novelist
 Esther Friesner, class of 1972 – prolific science fiction and fantasy author
 Paula Volsky, class of 1972 – fantasy author
 Marian Thurm, class of 1974 – author of short stories and novels, has taught Creative Writing at Yale and Columbia
 Elizabeth Spires, class of 1974 – award-winning poet and children's book writer
 Paco Underhill, class of 1975 – environmental psychologist and business writer
 Judith Regan, class of 1975 – controversial publisher
 Michael Gross, class of 1975 – writer and editor
 Avery Cardoza, class of 1977 – writer, gambler and publisher
 Lucette Lagnado, class of 1977 – journalist and novelist
 Diana Maychick, class of 1977 - author and NY Post columnist, W.K. Rose Fellow 
 Janet McDonald, class of 1977 – writer of young adult fiction
 Michael Specter, class of 1977 – award-winning journalist for The New Yorker and The New York Times
 Leonard Steinhorn, class of 1977 – author of The Greater Generation: In Defense of the Baby Boom Legacy; political analyst
 Victoria Strauss, class of 1977 – fantasy and science fiction author
 Josip Novakovich, class of 1978 – writer and professor
 Eric Marcus, class of 1980 – non-fiction writer
 Melissa Holbrook Pierson, class of 1980 – writer and essayist of non-fiction
 Peter Spiegelman, class of 1980 – crime fiction author and former Wall Street executive
 Ned Balbo, class of 1981 – award-winning poet
 Heinz Insu Fenkl, class of 1982 – award-winning writer, editor and translator
 Kimberly Quinn, class of 1982 – journalist, commentator and magazine publisher and writer
 Matthew Kauffman, class of 1983 – Hartford Courant journalist and Pulitzer Prize finalist
 A. V. Christie, class of 1985 – award-winning poet
 David Oliver Relin, class of 1985 – journalist and co-author of the controversial New York Times bestselling book, Three Cups of Tea
 Scott Westerfeld, class of 1985 – author of the Uglies series, among other novels
 Thomas Beller, class of 1987 – author
 Evan Wright, class of 1987 – author, best known for Generation Kill
 Mariah Fredericks, class of 1988 – author
 Adam Langer, class of 1988 – author
 Elizabeth Gaffney, class of 1988 – novelist and editor
 Sydney Pokorny, class of 1988 – writer, editor, columnist and activist
 Rebecca Stead, class of 1989 – award-winning author of children's literature
 Andy Towle, class of 1980 – blogger and media commentator, editor-in-chief of Genre magazine
 Richard Miniter, class of 1990 – investigative journalist and bestselling author
 Jen Van Meter, class of 1990 – comic book writer best known for her Oni Press series Hopeless Savages as well as series at Marvel and DC Comics
 Nunzio DeFilippis, class of 1991, and Christina Weir, class of 1992 – husband and wife comic book writing team
 Greg Rucka, class of 1991 – comic book writer
 Daphne Kalotay, class of 1992 – novelist, short story writer, and professor
 Meghan Daum, class of 1992 –  author, essayist, and journalist
 Sarah Gray Miller, class of 1993 – editor in chief of lifestyle and decorating magazine Country Living
 Megan Crane, class of 1994 – novelist
 Katherine Center, class of 1994 – author
 Andrew J. Porter, class of 1994 – short-story writer, novelist, and professor
 Joe Hill, class of 1995 – novelist, Heart-Shaped Box; son of Stephen King
 Jeremy Jackson, class of 1995 – author of several novels and cookbooks
 Ryan Singel, class of 1995 – blogger, co-founder of Contextly and Threat Level
 Carolyn Mackler, class of 1995 – author
 Jeremy Kaplan, class of 1996 – editor in chief of Digital Trends 
 Rachel Simmons, class of 1996 – Rhodes Scholar and author
 Taije Silverman, class of 1996, poet
 Owen King, class of 1999 – author; son of Stephen King
 Melissa Walker, class of 1999 – author
 Stephen Motika, class of 1999 – poet, editor, and publisher
 Jesse Ball, class of 2000 – poet and author
 Shaenon K. Garrity, class of 2000 – webcomics writer and artist
 Aimee Friedman, class of 2001 – writer of young adult fiction
 Alexandra Berzon, class of 2001 – Pulitzer Prize-winning writer
 Shelby Bach, class of 2008 – author
 M.J. Alexander
 Augusta Clawson
 Geri Doran – award-winning poet
 Michael Scharf – poet and critic
 Jane Mead – writer
 Delia Sherman – fantasy writer and editor
 Kimberly McCreight – author and lawyer
 Rosianna Halse Rojas – writer, video blogger, social media manager and online personality
 Michael Wolff, class of 1975 – author of Fire and Fury

Attended, but did not graduate
 Anthony Bourdain (graduated from The Culinary Institute of America), chef, writer
 Janet Cooke, journalist forced to return a Pulitzer Prize for a fabricated story (claimed to have had a degree but did not)
 Mike D (Michael Diamond), rapper (Beastie Boys)
 Jane Fonda (graduated from The Actors Studio), actress
 Katharine Graham (graduated from the University of Chicago), publisher of The Washington Post
 Anne Hathaway (graduated from New York University), actress
 Jacqueline Kennedy Onassis (graduated from George Washington University), First Lady
 Mark Ronson DJ
 Curtis Sittenfeld (graduated from Stanford University), author
 Anne-Marie O'Connor, (graduated from University of California at Berkeley), journalist, award-winning author of "The Lady in Gold, the Extraordinary Tale of Gustav Klimt's Masterpiece, Portrait of Adele Bloch-Bauer"
 Neil Strauss (graduated from Columbia College), author and journalist
 Rachael Yamagata (graduated from Northwestern University), singer

Fictional
As a famous and historically important college, Vassar has attracted much attention in fictional works. A partial list of cultural references to Vassar can be found here: Vassar College in popular culture.

Faculty

Anthropology Department
 Martha Warren Beckwith
 Ruth Benedict
 Martha Kaplan
 Margaret Mead, visiting lecturer
 Colin Turnbull, visiting lecturer

Art Department
 Leila Cook Barber, art historian.
Alfred H. Barr Jr.
 C.K. Chatterton
 Gregory Crewdson
 Richard Krautheimer
 Brian Lukacher
 Elias Lyman Magoon, visiting lecturer
 Molly Nesbit
 Linda Nochlin
 Lewis Pilcher
 Harry Roseman
 Concetta Scaravaglione
 Carolee Schneemann, visiting lecturer
 Andrew Tallon
 Oliver Samuel Tonks
 Henry Van Ingen

Dance Department
 Miriam Mahdaviani
 John Meehan (dancer)

Drama Department
 Jean Arthur
 Larry Atlas
 Catherine Filloux
 Hallie Flanagan
 Shona Tucker

English Department
 Donald Foster
 Eamon Grennan
 Hua Hsu
 Michael Joyce
 Amitava Kumar
 Kiese Laymon
 Thomas Mallon
 Gabriela Mistral
 Mary Mitchell
 Paul Russell
 Nancy Willard

History Department
 Robert K. Brigham
James H. Merrell
 Lucy Maynard Salmon

Mathematics Department
 Winifred Asprey
 Louise Duffield Cummings
 Grace Hopper

Music Department
 Gustav Dannreuther
 Karen Holvik
 Ernst Krenek
 Annea Lockwood
 Harold Meltzer
 Quincy Porter
 John Solum
 Richard Wilson

Philosophy Department
 Giovanna Borradori
 David Kelley
 Mitchell Miller
 Uma Narayan

Physics and Astronomy Department
 Debra Elmegreen
 Caroline Furness
 Maud Worcester Makemson
 Maria Mitchell
 Mary Watson Whitney

Political Science Department
 Mary Lyndon Shanley
 Peter Stillman

Psychology Department
 Margaret Floy Washburn
 Diana Zuckerman

Other departments
 Alida Avery, Physiology and Hygiene
 Harriet Isabel Ballintine, Athletics and Physical Education
 Mark Dion, visiting lecturer
 Liza Donnelly, The New Yorker staff cartoonist; American Culture and Women's Studies
 Heinz Insu Fenkl, writer, editor, folklorist, and translator; visiting faculty 
 Louise Holland, Academic, philologist and archaeologist
 Geoffrey A. Jehle, Economics
 Abby Leach, Greek
 Hannah Lyman, first lady principal of Vassar College
 Richard Möller, Coach of the Soccer team
 Joseph Nevins, Geography
 Aaron Louis Treadwell, Zoology
Adelaide Underhill, librarian

References

Eva March Tappan at Vassar College Libraries Archives & Special Collections Accessed December 10, 2008